Harold Newhouser (May 20, 1921 – November 10, 1998), nicknamed "Prince Hal," was an American professional baseball player. In Major League Baseball (MLB), he pitched 17 seasons on the Detroit Tigers and Cleveland Indians, from 1939 through 1955. Newhouser was an All-Star for six seasons and was considered to be the most dominating pitcher of the World War II era of baseball, winning the pitching triple crown for the Tigers in 1945. To date, he is also the only pitcher in MLB history ever to win two consecutive MVP awards. Newhouser was inducted into the National Baseball Hall of Fame in 1992.

After his retirement from baseball, Newhouser stepped away from the sport for 20 years, serving as a bank vice president. He later worked as a scout for several MLB teams, including the Houston Astros. Angered when they rebuffed his recommendation to draft future Hall of Famer Derek Jeter in favor of Phil Nevin, he quit shortly after.

Early life
Newhouser was a schoolboy star at Wilbur Wright High School in his hometown of Detroit, Michigan. Before he was approached by professional baseball teams, he had been saving money to attend a trade school by working several jobs. The young Newhouser sold newspapers, collected pop bottles and worked in a bowling alley before signing on in professional baseball.

A Tigers scout offered a $500 signing bonus to Newhouser, who found the sum of money to be unimaginable. Ten minutes after he signed, someone arrived from the Cleveland Indians; that employee had been prepared to offer $15,000 to his parents in addition to a $4,000 car.

Playing career

Early career
Newhouser made his debut for Detroit on September 29, 1939. In , he earned a spot on the Tigers out of spring training. In his first two full big-league seasons, the young left-hander experienced control problems, walking more batters than he struck out while posting win–loss records of 9–9 and 9–11.

As World War II got under way, the Tigers moved up in the standings because several of their top players, including Newhouser, were classified as 4-F (ineligible to be drafted). Newhouser was 4-F due to a leaky heart valve; he attempted to join the service anyway but was turned down several times.

That season, Newhouser rang up a 29–9 record, leading the league in wins and strikeouts (187). His 2.22 ERA was second in the league, as were his 25 complete games and six shutouts. The Tigers jumped into contention, finishing second in the American League, with Newhouser named MVP. Newhouser won the first Sporting News Pitcher of the Year Award in 1944.

By the  season, Newhouser had been selected for three consecutive AL All-Star teams. The 1945 All-Star Game was cancelled on April 24 because of travel restrictions and seven out of eight scheduled interleague games were played in place of the All-Star Game on July 9 and 10 to support the American Red Cross and War Relief fund. Newhouser became the first pitcher to repeat as MVP that season and helped the team win the World Series. He won the pitcher's Triple Crown, leading the AL in wins (25, against nine losses), ERA (1.81) and strikeouts (212); he also led the league in innings pitched, games started, complete games and shutouts. Newhouser pitched four innings of relief on the season's final day as Detroit rallied for the pennant. Newhouser won the second Sporting News Pitcher of the Year Award.  He became the youngest player (24) to win the award in two consecutive years. In that year's World Series against the Chicago Cubs, Newhouser won two games, including a complete-game victory in the deciding seventh game.

Later career

In , he went 26–9 with a 1.94 ERA, again leading the league in wins and ERA. His 275 strikeouts was second in the league. Newhouser was runner-up in the MVP race to Ted Williams. Newhouser continued to rate among the game's best pitchers for the next five years.

In his final big-league hurrah, he posted a 7–2 mark with a 2.54 ERA, and got to pitch in his second World Series. He ended his career with a record of 207–150 and a 3.06 ERA. He is the only pitcher ever to win consecutive MVP awards.

As a hitter, Newhouser had a .201 career batting average (201-for-999) with 70 runs, 2 home runs, 81 RBI and 89 bases on balls. Defensively, he recorded a .971 fielding percentage covering 488 games pitched.

Newhouser tried to vary his pitch selection. Even if he threw a batter the same variety of pitch twice in a row, he would always change speeds slightly, to keep the hitters guessing.

Later life

Newhouser spent his first 20 years after retiring from baseball away from the sport, working as a bank vice president in Pontiac, Michigan.

Eventually, he served as a scout for the Baltimore Orioles, Cleveland Indians,  Detroit Tigers, and Houston Astros.  As a scout with the Orioles, Newhouser discovered Milt Pappas, a Detroit high schooler who went on to win 209 games in an All-Star career—two more than Newhouser did. He also signed future Cy Young Award winner Dean Chance, who later earned the trophy with the Los Angeles Angels in 1964.

While with the Astros, Newhouser was credited with discovering Derek Jeter, whom the Astros passed over for Phil Nevin. He quit his job with the Astros after they ignored his advice to draft Jeter, though he had planned to retire after that season in any case.

In , he was elected to the National Baseball Hall of Fame. His induction class included Tom Seaver, Rollie Fingers and Bill McGowan. The ceremony was attended by a then-record-setting crowd of 20,000 people. He died on November 10, 1998, in a hospital in Southfield, Michigan. He had been ill with emphysema and heart problems.

Personal life
Newhouser was married to his wife, the former Beryl Margaret Steele (1922–2012), from 1941 until his death. They had two daughters, Charlene and Sherrill.

During his playing days, Newhouser's teammates nicknamed him "Prince Hal" because of the way he carried himself.

See also

 List of Major League Baseball career wins leaders
 Major League Baseball Triple Crown
 List of Major League Baseball annual strikeout leaders
 List of Major League Baseball annual wins leaders
 Major League Baseball titles leaders
 Best pitching seasons by a Detroit Tiger
 Sporting News Pitcher of the Year Award
 Sporting News Player of the Year Award

Notes

References

External links

Hal Newhouser Oral History Interview (1 of 2) - National Baseball Hall of Fame Digital Collection
Hal Newhouser Oral History Interview (2 of 2) - National Baseball hall of Fame Digital Collection

National Baseball Hall of Fame inductees
American League All-Stars
American League ERA champions
American League strikeout champions
American League wins champions
American League Pitching Triple Crown winners
Detroit Tigers players
Cleveland Indians players
Major League Baseball pitchers
Baseball players from Detroit
Murray–Wright High School alumni
Major League Baseball players with retired numbers
Alexandria Aces players
Beaumont Exporters players
Houston Astros scouts
Baltimore Orioles scouts
Cleveland Indians scouts
Detroit Tigers scouts
1921 births
1998 deaths
American League Most Valuable Player Award winners
Respiratory disease deaths in Michigan
Deaths from emphysema